Charles Joly (born October 24, 1995) is a Canadian soccer player currently playing with Laval Rouge et Or.

Career  
Joly was part of the Montreal Impact Academy from 2012 to 2014, where he played in the Canadian Soccer League, and the USL Premier Development League. On March 13, 2015, Joly signed with FC Montreal, a USL affiliate club of the Montreal Impact for their inaugural season. On July 2, 2015 he recorded his first hat-trick against Saint Louis FC. On March 11, 2016 he re-signed with Montreal for the 2016 season.

In 2017, he began playing at the college level with Laval Rouge et Or. In his debut season he was named to the Second All-Star team, and a second time in 2019.

International career 
He represented the province of Quebec at the 2013 Canada Summer Games, where the team won the gold medal. He was selected for the tournament All-Star team and named Top Player. In 2014, he was called to camp for the Canada U20 team under head coach Rob Gale.

References

External links 
 

1995 births
Living people
Canadian soccer players
Montreal Impact U23 players
FC Montreal players
Association football forwards
Canadian Soccer League (1998–present) players
USL League Two players
USL Championship players
Soccer people from Quebec
Laval Rouge et Or athletes